Exit is an album by guitarist Pat Martino which was recorded in 1976 and first released on the Muse label.

Reception

In his review on Allmusic, Scott Yanow notes that "This LP gave listeners a good sampling of mid-1970s Pat Martino... An excellent outing."

A reviewer for Billboard stated: "Bass, piano and drums surround the guitarist... Program of six tracks ranges from frothy bossa nova through Ellington's reflective 'Come Sunday' theme to Benny Golson's semi-classic 'I Remember Clifford' with markedly effective interplay between Martino and the virtuosic bass pluckings of Richard Davis."

Track listing 
All compositions by Pat Martino except as indicated
 "Exit" - 9:23    
 "Come Sunday" (Duke Ellington) - 7:30
 "Three Base Hit" - 4:30    
 "Days of Wine and Roses" (Henry Mancini, Johnny Mercer) - 4:47    
 "Blue Bossa" (Kenny Dorham) - 4:57    
 "I Remember Clifford" (Benny Golson) - 7:48

Personnel 
Pat Martino - guitar
Gil Goldstein - piano
Richard Davis - bass
Jabali Billy Hart - drums

References 

Pat Martino albums
1977 albums
Muse Records albums